Autumn de Wilde (born October 21, 1970) is an American photographer and film director best known for her portraiture and commercial work photography of musicians, as well as her music video works. In 2020 she directed her first feature film, Emma.

Early life
De Wilde was born in Woodstock, New York. She received no formal photography training, but learned it from her father Jerry de Wilde, an art and commercial photographer most noted for his photos of Jimi Hendrix and other musicians at the Monterey Pop Festival, and other icons of the 1960s.

Career
De Wilde has photographed CD covers for Miranda Cosgrove, Elliott Smith,  She & Him, Jenny Lewis with the Watson Twins, The Raconteurs, The White Stripes, Fiona Apple, Beck, Built to Spill, Wilco, Monsters of Folk, New Found Glory, and a number of other musicians. She has directed music videos for Beck, The Decemberists, Elliott Smith, Florence and the Machine, Spoon, Ingrid Michaelson, The Raconteurs, Rilo Kiley and Death Cab for Cutie. Her portrait subjects include Willie Nelson, Sean Watkins, Ryan Adams, Sonic Youth, Tegan and Sara, and Wolfmother.  Her live concert documentary work includes The Flaming Lips, Spoon, and the Arcade Fire. Her photos have appeared on the cover of Spin magazine and in the pages of Rolling Stone, Filter, Nylon, Los Angeles Times, Entertainment Weekly, and The New York Times. She has also documented couture designers Kate and Laura Mulleavy of Rodarte.

In 2007 Chronicle Books released a book, Elliott Smith, that includes de Wilde's photographs of musician Elliott Smith as well as handwritten lyrics, interviews with close friends and family, and a bonus CD of a live performance.

In 2010, de Wilde provided commentary on a series of reissues of the back catalog of Nick Cave & The Bad Seeds, appearing in the accompanying documentaries entitled Do You Love Me Like I Love You.

In 2011, her work was extensively featured in the limited edition deluxe box version of The Decemberists album The King Is Dead. It included her one-of-a-kind Polaroid photograph from the Impossible Project/Decemberists series, and a 72-page hardcover book with over 250 of her Polaroid photos and illustrations by Carson Ellis.

De Wilde made her directorial feature film debut with the 2020 film Emma., adapted from Jane Austen's novel of the same name,  starring Anya Taylor-Joy. She previously directed segments of the HBO documentary Six by Sondheim.

In 2022, De Wilde photographed Florence Welch for Vogue UK ahead of the release of Florence and the Machine's album Dance Fever. 

She is managed by Anonymous Content.

Personal life
De Wilde was married to drummer Aaron Sperske. Footage from their wedding appeared in the music video for "By Your Side" by Beachwood Sparks. Their daughter, Arrow de Wilde, is the lead singer for the Los Angeles-based band Starcrawler.

Filmography

Awards and nominations

See also
 List of female film and television directors

References

Further reading

External links
 
 The Photography of Autumn de Wilde
 
 Autumn de Wilde's photos of Panic! at the Disco in Spin magazine
 Autumn DeWilde's Guest DJ Project on KCRW KCRW Guest DJ set

1970 births
Living people
21st-century American photographers
American music video directors
American women film directors
American portrait photographers
People from Woodstock, New York
Photographers from New York (state)
Film directors from New York (state)
21st-century American women photographers